The 34th Sports Emmy Awards were presented on May 7, 2013 at the Frederick P. Rose Hall at the Jazz at Lincoln Center in New York City.

Awards

Programs

Personalities

Technical

Awards by Network Group

References

 033
Sports Emmy Awards
Emmy Awards